Gobiomorus is a genus of fishes in the family Eleotridae native to marine, fresh and brackish waters along the Pacific and Atlantic coasts of the Americas.

Species
The recognized species in this genus are:
 Gobiomorus dormitor Lacépède, 1800 (bigmouth sleeper)
 Gobiomorus maculatus (Günther, 1859) (Pacific sleeper)
 Gobiomorus polylepis Ginsburg, 1953 (finescale sleeper)

References

Eleotridae